Urophora agromyzella is a species of tephritid or fruit flies in the genus Urophora of the family Tephritidae.

Distribution
Uganda, Malawi, Zimbabwe, South Africa.

References

Urophora
Insects described in 1924
Diptera of Africa